The Rolls-Royce–Bentley L-series V8 engine is an engine introduced in 1959. Built in Crewe, it was used on most Rolls-Royce and Bentley automobiles in the four decades after its introduction and was used in the Bentley Mulsanne until 2020.

With BMW's acquisition of the rights to use the Rolls-Royce name in 1998, Rolls-Royce Motor Cars began using BMW supplied V12 engines but Bentley under Volkswagen Group ownership continued to use highly modified versions of the L series on its Arnage, Azure, Brooklands and Mulsanne models, with VAG W-12 and V8 engines being used in its Continental GT, Flying Spur and Bentayga models.

History
The first engine of V8 configuration was developed in 1904 by Léon Levavasseur in France and used for speedboat racing. It was not a success, with only three made and just one sold, which was soon returned to the factory to be scrapped. It was another decade before Cadillac pioneered a mass production V8-engined automobile.

Rolls-Royce acquired Bentley in 1931 and continued to use Bentley engines alongside their own for a time, although none was a V8. Prior to World War II, Rolls-Royce had developed a 7.3-litre V-12 for the Phantom III, which was succeeded by the inlet-over-exhaust B60 straight-6 and B80 straight-8 series of engines. The B80 powered the Phantom IV limousine, whilst the 4.3-litre B60 was used until 1955 to power the Rolls-Royce Silver Wraith and Silver Dawn and the Bentley Mark VI. The B60's bore was enlarged in 1955, increasing the displacement to 4.9 litres, that engine being known as the B61.

The need for a new engine was recognised by Rolls-Royce in the early 1950s and its development began in 1952, bearing no relation to the 1905 Rolls-Royce V8.

Developments of the L410 continued in production powering Rolls-Royces up to 1998 and Bentleys into the 21st century. Bentley, under Volkswagen ownership since 1998, continues to develop the L410 for its range of cars. Rolls-Royce ceased using the L410 with the switch to BMW ownership of that brand in March 1998 and introduction of a BMW sourced V12 engine in the Rolls-Royce Silver Seraph.

Since 1998 therefore, development and use of the L410 engine can be said to have been exclusively a Bentley enterprise.

L-series engine nomenclature
The factory nomenclature for the L-series V8 engines, in chronological order, is as follows:
 L380      1950s  initial development version
 L410      1959  production version powering Silver Cloud II, Phantom, and S2 series
 L425      1965  experimental version
 L410B    1965  updated production version powering Silver Shadow and T series
 L410       1970  production version, capacity increase achieved by 'stroking' to 
 L410E     1970s  development version with  stroke
 L380       1970s  "Thermodynamically Optimised Porsche (TOP)" experimental version
 L410D     1982  turbocharged production version installed in Bentley Mulsanne
 L410I     1986  fuel injected version
 L410IT     1987  fuel injected production version in Bentley Mulsanne Turbo
 L410ITI    1991  fuel injected, turbo, intercooled production version of Bentley Turbo R & S and Continental R & S
 L410MT     1997  low pressure turbo
 L410MT/S     1997  turbo
 L675        1998  development name for Arnage version of the turbo, later reverted to "L410"
 L410TT   2007  production version introducing twin MHI turbochargers with intercooler
 L410HT   2009  variable cam phasing "high-torque" production version for 2009 Mulsanne

Marine engine 
 LM 841      c1963-4   marinised version of the engine available with port or starboard crank rotations

Main engine capacities

6.25-litre
The engine was of an overhead valve (OHV) design, angled at 90 degrees, and featured a central camshaft and wedge-shaped combustion chambers.

When new, the Rolls-Royce/Bentley V8 was rumoured to be an American engine design licence-built, but it was developed in-house by Rolls-Royce and Bentley engineers. This can be seen in its design characteristics, with features like an aluminium alloy cylinder block with wet liners, gear-driven camshaft, (initially) outboard spark plugs and porting inspired by the Rolls-Royce Merlin aircraft engine. The deep skirted crankcase design is also rare with American V8 engines. Rolls-Royce however did use General Motors transmissions in their vehicles, notably the Hydramatic in Silver Cloud and the Turbo-Hydramatic in the Silver Shadow.

The marine version of the engine (LM 841) was sold directly as a "complete power pack". It was available with either direction of crankshaft rotation to suit port or starboard propellers. Engine cooling was closed loop glycol with heat exchangers to pumped sea water. It was supplied complete with a BorgWarner "velvet drive" gearbox.

Models
Rolls-Royce Silver Cloud II and III (1959–1966)
Rolls-Royce Phantom V (1959–1968)
Bentley S2 (1959–1962)
Bentley S3 (1962–1965)
Rolls-Royce Silver Shadow (1965–1970)
Bentley T-series (1965–1980)
Rolls-Royce Phantom VI (1968–1982)

Production
Rolls-Royce Limited (1959–1973)
Bentley, subsidiary thereof
Rolls-Royce Motors (1973–1982), subsidiary of Vickers plc (from 1980)
Bentley, subsidiary thereof

6.75-Litre

Known as the Six and Three-Quarter Litre or simply the Six and Three-Quarter, it is the most widely used and well known of all the versions and possibly the most famous British V8 engine of all time, save for the Rover V8 engine.

The Rolls-Royce/Bentley V8 is the engine with the second-longest production run in history, following the Chevrolet Small-block V8. As the Chevrolet small-block engine is now only available as a crate engine and its successor the GM LS engine is dynamically unrelated to it, the Rolls-Royce/Bentley V8 can be considered to be the engine with the longest production run in history that is still fitted to a vehicle from factory.

The power output of the 6.75-litre over the 6.25-litre version was not very significant at the outset, the emphasis being on increased torque. The plethora of revisions introduced throughout its life were primarily to comply with emissions; one of the most notable changes is the new firing order of 1-5-4-8-6-3-7-2 introduced in 1987. With improved tuning and the addition of turbochargers, the 6.75-litre became one of the world's most powerful automobile engines and enormously enhanced the image of Bentley as a sporting car maker.

The process of evolving the engine has been gradual and continuous; by 2006 almost all the 1959-specification engine components had been upgraded, so that the current twin-turbo 6.75-litre engine produces over 150% more motive power and torque than at the beginning of its life, has 40% better fuel economy, and produces 99.5% less exhaust emission.

The   engine used in Bentley Mulsanne was built at Crewe plant, and takes nearly 30 hours to build.

The twin-turbo V8 engine was reported to be phased out, although it continues to be cast by Grainger and Worrall in Bridgnorth, Shropshire, England and fully machined and partially assembled at the company's machining facility in Telford, Shropshire, England.

Models
Rolls-Royce Phantom VI (1968–1991)
Rolls-Royce Silver Shadow (1970–1980)
Bentley T-series (1970–1980)
Rolls-Royce Corniche (1971–1996)
Rolls-Royce Camargue (1975–1986)
Rolls-Royce Silver Spirit (1980–1998)
Rolls-Royce Silver Spur/Flying Spur (1980–1998)
Bentley Mulsanne (1980–1992)
Bentley Eight (1984–1992)
Bentley Turbo R, Turbo S (1985–1997)
Bentley Azure (1995–2003, 2006–2009)
Bentley Continental R, Continental S (1991–2003)
Bentley Brooklands (1992–1998)
Bentley Turbo RT (1997–1998)
Bentley Arnage (1998–2009)
Rolls-Royce Corniche, Corniche S (2000) (2000–2002)
Bentley Brooklands Coupé (2008–2011)
Bentley Mulsanne (2010) (2010–2020)

Production
Rolls-Royce Limited (1968–1973)
Bentley, subsidiary thereof
Rolls-Royce Motors (1973–2002), subsidiary of Vickers plc (1980–1998)
Bentley, subsidiary thereof (until 1998)
Bentley Motors Limited, subsidiary of Volkswagen Group (1998–2020)

The marques' split
BMW began supplying Rolls-Royce and Bentley with engines in 1998, specifically a V12 engine for the Rolls-Royce Silver Seraph and a twin-turbo 4.4-litre V8 engine to replace the 6.75-litre for the Bentley Arnage. BMW V8 engines were used exclusively in the Arnage from 1998 to 2000.

Vickers plc placed the Rolls-Royce and Bentley car manufacturing business up for sale in 1997, shortly after the introduction of the new models, in order that they could focus on their core defence business. BMW were initially expected to agree to a purchase quickly given their existing engine and component supply contracts with Rolls-Royce and Bentley, together with their recent history of expansion in the UK, with the purchase of Rover Group. BMW would go on to warn Mayflower Corporation that it would cease to supply engines should they purchase Vickers or Rolls-Royce and Bentley, and that it considered itself the best buyer for the company in late 1997.

BMW would reach an agreement with Vickers to acquire Rolls-Royce and Bentley Motor Cars on 31 April 1998 for £340m, but this was superseded by an agreement for Volkswagen Group to acquire the business for £430m, which was announced eight days later, on 7 May 1998. The Volkswagen sale appeared to have collapsed later in May, with BMW being announced as the preferred buyer for the Rolls-Royce and Bentley business 1 June 1998, subject to shareholder approval. Shareholder approval was not forthcoming and the BMW deal collapsed when Volkswagen subsidiary Audi agreed to buy Cosworth from Vickers for £120m only if Volkswagen Group's £430m bid for Rolls-Royce and Bentley was accepted.

Volkswagen's bid to purchase Rolls-Royce and Bentley Motors from Vickers was finally accepted, and a price of £479m was paid, but by the end of July 1998, it became apparent that they would be unable to market any vehicle under the Rolls-Royce brand or use the Rolls-Royce badge on any of their products, as they had not acquired the rights to the Rolls-Royce brand name or the Rolls-Royce badge, which were retained by the aero engine manufacturer Rolls-Royce plc following the 1973 divestment of the car manufacturing business, and Rolls-Royce plc were not prepared to allow Volkswagen to license this crucial intellectual property.

Three way negotiations between Volkswagen Group, BMW and Rolls-Royce plc resulted in BMW purchasing the rights to the Rolls-Royce brand and badge from Rolls-Royce plc for £40m. Rolls-Royce plc, who had been involved in an aero engine joint venture with BMW since 1990 consistently supported their long time business partner during the bidding process for Rolls-Royce and Bentley Motors.

German politicians brokered a deal between Volkswagen Group and BMW to ensure BMW would continue to supply engines, transmissions and key components for a five-year period, with BMW sub-licensing the necessary intellectual property to allow Volkswagen to build and sell the Rolls-Royce Silver Seraph. It was considered damaging to the German automotive industry for Volkswagen and BMW to engage in legal action against each other.

The deal reached allowed Volkswagen Group to retain use of the Rolls-Royce brand until the end of 2002, when Rolls-Royce Motors transferred to BMW control, leaving VW with the Bentley marque, the factory, and ownership of all current models (although production of the Rolls-Royce Silver Seraph was discontinued).

BMW no longer owns the rights to produce any pre-2003 Rolls-Royce or Bentley engines. The Rolls-Royce Phantom VII and its derivatives use a normally aspirated BMW V12 engine, which has no technical similarities with the L410 engine. The Rolls-Royce Ghost introduced in 2010 uses a 6.6-litre twin-turbo V12.

Under Volkswagen Group, the Bentley Arnage's BMW engine was phased out from 2000 to 2002 and the L410 engine was reintroduced in highly redeveloped form. The Arnage-derived Brooklands uses the most powerful version of the engine yet. Those models and the convertible Bentley Azure are produced alongside the Bentley Mulsanne and smaller Bentleys based on the Continental GT, which use the Volkswagen Group W-12 engine.

References

External links
Rolls-Royce Motor Car Engines: The V8: Birth and Beginnings, Development of the non-turbocharged Rolls-Royce V8 Engine 1959-98: illustrated with engines in the basement of The Hunt House

L-series V8 engine
Bentley engines
Gasoline engines by model
Automobile engines
V8 engines